Nikolay Adamets (18 October 1983 – 7 September 2014) was a Belarusian footballer who last played for Volna Pinsk. He died on 7 September 2014 after being hospitalized three days earlier with a cerebral haemorrhage.

References

External links
 
 

1983 births
2014 deaths
Belarusian footballers
Association football goalkeepers
FC Granit Mikashevichi players
FC Slavia Mozyr players
FC Minsk players
FC Volna Pinsk players